Pilar Vallugera i Balañà (born 13 October 1967) is a Spanish politician from Catalonia and a member of the Congress of Deputies of Spain.

Early life
Vallugera was born on 13 October 1967 in Barcelona, Catalonia. She has a degree in law from the University of Barcelona.

Vallugera was a member of the National Front of Catalonia (FNC) and Crida a la Solidaritat. She joined the Republican Left of Catalonia (ERC) in 1988 and was the second vice-president of political action for its Barcelona branch. She was a member of ERC's national executive from 2006 to 2007.

Career
Vallugera has worked for the Government of Catalonia since 1986. She was head of the head of the subscription unit from 1989 to 2003 and head of the editorial co-ordination unit of the Entitat Autónoma del Diari Oficial i de Publicacions (EADOP) from 2007.

Vallugera was president of the Casal de Ciutat Vella (1997-1999) and district councilor of Ciutat Vella (1999-2003). At the 1999 local elections she was placed 11th on the Republican Left of Catalonia–The Greens-Acord Municipal (ERC–EV–AM) electoral alliance's list of candidates in Barcelona but the alliance only managed to win three seats in the city and as a result she failed to get elected. She contested the 2003 local elections as a Republican Left of Catalonia-Acord Municipal (ERC–AM) candidate in Barcelona and was elected. At the 2007 local elections she was placed fifth on ERC–AM's list of candidates in Barcelona but the alliance only managed to win four seats in the city and as a result she failed to get re-elected.

At the April 2019 general election Vallugera was placed ninth on the Republican Left of Catalonia–Sovereigntists electoral alliance's list of candidates in the Province of Barcelona but the alliance only managed to win eight seats in the province and as a result she failed to get elected. She contested the November 2019 general election as a Republican Left of Catalonia–Sovereigntists electoral alliance candidate in the Province of Barcelona and was elected to the Congress of Deputies.

Personal life
Vallugera has two children.

Electoral history

References

External links

1967 births
Barcelona municipal councillors
Women politicians from Catalonia
Living people
Members of the 14th Congress of Deputies (Spain)
Republican Left of Catalonia politicians
University of Barcelona alumni
Women members of the Congress of Deputies (Spain)